Johann Thomas Noetzel (born 4 April 1977 in Seattle, United States) is a Northern Mariana Islands professional football player and manager.

Career
He played one game for the Dallas Burn.

In 2012, he made his debut for the Northern Mariana Islands national football team.

In 2012, he coached the Northern Mariana Islands national football team.

References

External links

Profile at Soccerpunter.com

1977 births
Living people
American people of German descent
American soccer players
Northern Mariana Islands footballers
Northern Mariana Islands international footballers
Association football goalkeepers
FC Dallas players
Major League Soccer players
Expatriate footballers in the Philippines
American soccer coaches
Northern Mariana Islands football managers
Northern Mariana Islands national football team managers
Stallion Laguna F.C. players
Soccer players from Seattle